Zero to One: Notes on Startups, or How to Build the Future is a 2014 book by the American entrepreneur and investor Peter Thiel co-written with Blake Masters. It is a condensed and updated version of a highly popular set of online notes taken by Masters for the CS183 class on startups, as taught by Thiel at Stanford University in Spring 2012.

Promotion
To promote the book, Peter Thiel sent out his first (and only) tweet ever on September 8, 2014. He was also interviewed by Alexia Tsotsis of TechCrunch. On September 9, Thiel was interviewed on Timothy Ferriss' podcast. On September 11, Thiel answered  questions for Ask Me Anything on Reddit.

On September 13, Thiel appeared on NPR with host Wade Goodwyn to discuss the book.

Reception
In The Atlantic, Derek Thomson describes Thiel's book as possibly the best business book he has ever read.  In his review article, he wrote: "Peter Thiel's new book, Zero to One, shines like a laser beam. Yes, this is a self-help book for entrepreneurs, bursting with bromides and sunny confidence about the future that only start-ups can build. But much more than that, it's also a lucid and profound articulation of capitalism and success in the 21st century economy" and "it's surprising in a wonderful way just how simple Zero to One feels. Barely 200 pages long, and well lit by clear prose and pithy aphorisms, Thiel has written a perfectly tweetable treatise and a relentlessly thought-provoking handbook".

Publishers Weekly wrote of the book: "Thiel touches on how to build a successful business, but the discussion is too abstract to offer much to the next Steve Jobs—or Peter Thiel."

In November 2014, Timothy B. Lee reviewed the book for Vox.com, writing that although Thiel's book contained some good advice, he made the advice sound more contrarian than it really was, did not provide sufficiently concrete advice, and made some questionable claims.

In The New Atlantis, James Poulos compares Thiel to Frederich Nietzsche and argues Thiel, "the most political and theoretical of the supernerds," writes esoterically in Zero to One, when he "raises the prospect of a remarkably comprehensive failure among our best and brightest."

References

2014 non-fiction books
Business books
Books about companies
Entrepreneurship
Crown Publishing Group books